Guy I Brisebarre (died after 1148) was Lord of Beirut in the Kingdom of Jerusalem.

In 1127, King Baldwin II of Jerusalem sent him to France, together with the Templar Masters Hugh of Payns and William I of Bures, to find a husband for the heir to the throne of Jerusalem, Baldwin's daughter Melisende. In the spring of 1129, they traveled back to the Holy Land with Count Fulk V of Anjou, where they arrived in May.

By 1138, Guy I was appointed as lord of Beirut, succeeding his brother Walter I. In 1148, he took part in the Council of Acre, 
and the subsequent Siege of Damascus, in which he was nominated by local barons to rule the city when conquered.

He probably had two sons who inherited him after his death: 

Walter II (died 1169), Lord of Beirut, later Templar
Guy II (died before 1164), lord of Beirut.

References

Bibliography 

Lords of Beirut
Christians of the Second Crusade
1140s deaths